Lucius Pinarius Mamercinus Rufus was a Roman politician during the 5th century BC, and was consul in 472 BC.

Biography

Consulship
In 472 BC, he was elected consul with Publius Furius Medullinus Fusus. During their consulship, tribune of the plebs Volero Publilius proposed a law (Rogato Publilia) providing that plebeian tribunes should be elected by the Tribal Assembly, hoping to exclude patricians and their clients in the vote and deprive them of their influence under the resulting system.

An inscription finds that during his consulship, a Vestal named either Orbinia or Sunia was put to death for the crime of incestum (sexual misconduct). The Vestals were expected to remain virgins, and a woman tending the sacred hearth of Vesta after losing her virginity was considered sacrilege.

According to Varro, the "Lex Pinaria Furia of the intercalary month" is ascribed to Furius and Pinarius. It mentions the method of additional days permitted to the dispenser of days which could be added to the calendar based on the lunar cycle.

References

Modern sources

Ancient sources

Bibliography

Ancient authors
 Dionysius of Halicarnassus in Romaike Archaiologia book 9
 Titus Livius in Roman History book 2.

Modern authors
 
 

5th-century BC Roman consuls
Mamercinus Rufus, Lucius